Soap is a surfactant cleaning compound used for personal or other cleaning.

Soap may also refer to:

Education
 Supplemental Offer and Acceptance Program, for medical students who were not initially matched with U.S. residencies by the National Resident Matching Program

Entertainment
 Soap opera, ongoing, episodic work of fiction on TV or radio
 Soap (TV series), a 1970s sitcom
 S.O.A.P. (duo), a Danish pop music duo
 Sons of All Pussys, a Japanese band often abbreviated S.O.A.P.
 Captain Soap MacTavish, fictional soldier from the Call of Duty: Modern Warfare series
 Hotel Soap is an animated cartoon character in the Dr. Tran animated series of internet shorts
 An abbreviation for Snakes on a Plane, a 2006 film
 "Soap" (song), Melanie Martinez single

Science and technology
 Sugar soap, a material used for cleaning surfaces before repainting
 SOAP (originally an acronym for Simple Object Access Protocol), a protocol specification in computer networks
 Spectrometric Oil Analysis Program, a method for testing the oil in aircraft engines for the concentration of critical metals to identify wear of engine parts
 Symbolic Optimal Assembly Program, an assembly language for the IBM 650 computer
 SOAP note, a method of documentation used in medical charts
 Short Oligonucleotide Analysis Package, a bioinformatics package used for the assembly and analysis of DNA sequences
 SOAP ("Simplify Obscure Algol Programs"), an Algol 60 prettyprinter

See also
 Soap Creek (Missouri), a stream in the U.S. state of Missouri
 Soap shoes, skateboarding shoes made for grinding
 Joe Soap, a comic strip series
 En Soap, 2006 Danish comedy film